The New Taipei Municipal Hsin Tien Senior High School is a senior high school in Xindian District, New Taipei, Taiwan which was founded in 1992.

Honor roll 

The student 孔德偉 was awarded a silver medal at the International  Earth Science Olympiad, IESO 2009.
The student 郭俊毅 was awarded a silver medal and a special prize  Olympiad, IESO 2011.
The students 李芷郁 and 陳思穎 were awarded first prize of Earth Science at 2011 Taiwan International Science Fair; in addition, they were also the chosen national representatives that participated in the 62nd International Science and Engineering Fair.

School activities 

 Chinese poem recital contest
 English singing contest
 Oath-taking ceremony for seniors
 International exchange with Japanese schools
 Foreign exchange programs
 Club Performances
 Performances by the music class at National Music Hall
 Reading Club Presentations
 Volunteer camps
 Literature and Arts camps

Transportation
The school is accessible within walking distance north of Xiaobitan Station of Taipei Metro.

See also
 Education in Taiwan

References

External links

  (English)

1992 establishments in Taiwan
Educational institutions established in 1992
High schools in Taiwan
Schools in New Taipei